Mohan Kumar Fans is a 2021 Indian Malayalam-language comedy drama film written and directed by Jis Joy. The film is produced by Listin Stephen under the banner of Magic Frames. Kunchacko Boban played the role of a singer. The film also features Siddique, Anarkali Nazar, Mukesh, Sreenivasan, Vinay Forrt, Saiju Kurup, Ramesh Pisharody and Krishna Shankar in pivotal roles. The songs are composed by Prince George, while the score is composed by William Francis. The film premiered on 19 March 2021.

Synopsis
The story revolves around Mohan Kumar a yesteryear actor who has recently made his comeback in a film after many years. He is passionate about movies and has hopes of winning a national award for his recent performance. The film explores his relationship with movies and how his friends and family support him in achieving his dreams.

Cast

Reception
The film received mixed reviews from critics.
Awarding the film 3.5 on a scale of 5, Sajin Shrijith from The New Indian Express wrote; "its a fairly effective blend of satire and emotional drama. He added despite the excess melodrama, Mohan Kumar Fans manages to be a smile-inducing entertainer."

References

External links
 

2020s Malayalam-language films
2021 films
2021 comedy-drama films
Indian comedy-drama films
Indian drama road movies
Films directed by Jis Joy